Denteilema is a monotypic moth genus in the subfamily Arctiinae. Its only species, Denteilema unicolora,  is endemic to Vietnam. Both the genus and species were first described by Vladimir Viktorovitch Dubatolov in 2012.

The forewings are brownish grey with androconial scales scattered through the discal cell and beyond it. The hindwings are unicolourous yellowish grey.

References

External links

Moths described in 2012
Endemic fauna of Vietnam
Lithosiina
Monotypic moth genera
Moths of Asia